Labeo pellegrini is a species of fish in the genus Labeo which is endemic to the Juba River in Ethiopia.

References 

Endemic fauna of Ethiopia
Labeo
Fish described in 1939